ScreenLimit was a time based content-control software for parents to control the time their children spend on devices.

Working
Children can do assigned tasks like homework to earn more time. Multiple people can use the same or more devices in combination with their own time. They will get a warning when time runs out. When time runs out icons or the desktop will disappear and the ScreenLimit timer page will appear. Multiple schedules can be made like weekend/schoolday/vacation. An example of a schedule could be: Block at 22:00 (regardless of unspent time); Add 60 minutes (a day) at 00:01; UnBlock at 07:00. Parents can see realtime who is using what device. Parents can also manually (un)block a child. With one account multiple children and devices can be managed by multiple parents.

History
ScreenLimit was first released in November 2016.
ScreenLimit was closed on 22 January 2019.

Reviews
PC Advisor Full Review

Educational App Store Teacher's Review

See also 
Comparison of content-control software and providers

References

External links
 ScreenLimit - Official Website

Content-control software
Internet safety
Cross-platform software
iOS software
Android (operating system) software
Windows software